Paraglaciecola aquimarina is a Gram-negative, aerobic and non-motile bacterium from the genus of Paraglaciecola which has been isolated from seawater from the coast of Korea.

References

External links
Type strain of Paraglaciecola aquimarina at BacDive -  the Bacterial Diversity Metadatabase

Bacteria described in 2013
Alteromonadales